Rabarock was a rock festival held annually in Järvakandi, Estonia between 2005–2009 and 2011–2012. It took place in the first half of June.

Dates and headliners
2012, 15–16 June
Andrew W.K. (USA), The Big Pink (UK), Dramamama (EST), Dub FX & Flower Fairy (AUS), Dwarves (USA), Ewert and The Two Dragons (EST), The Experimental Tropic Blues Band (BEL), G-Enka (EST), Kosmikud (EST), Kukerpillid (EST), Liis Lemsalu (EST), Mahavok (EST), Menwhopause (IND), Merwis (EST), Metsatöll (EST), Reckless Love (FIN), Skyforger (LAT), The Stranglers (UK), Tenfold Rabbit (EST).
The Von Hertzen Brothers (FIN) cancelled its planned show on 15 June and was replaced by Mahavok(EST).
2011, 17–18 June
Abraham (EST), Aides (EST), Anal Thunder (FIN), Apelsin (EST), The Bad Ass Brass Band (FIN), Circle (FIN), Def Räädu (EST), DND (UK), Electric Wizard (UK), Ewert & The Two Dragons (EST), Filter (USA), Goresoerd (EST), IAMX (UK), J.M.K.E. (EST), Kurjam (EST), Metsatöll (EST), Mustasch (SWE), Nevesis (EST), NoMeansNo (CAN), Orelipoiss (EST), Pendulum (AU), Public Image Ltd (UK), Rock-Hotel plays Rock-Hotel 1983 (EST), Rock Reality band (EST), Singer Vinger (EST), Sunrise Avenue (FIN), Teräsbetoni (FIN), Ultima Thule (EST), Winny Puhh (EST).
2010, Rabarock was cancelled due to financial crises.
2009, 12–13 June
A.Human (UK), Anthrax (USA), B.D.Ö. (EST), Gary Numan (UK), KMFDM (GER), Kosmikud (EST), Ladytron (UK), Metsatöll (EST), No-Big-Silence (EST), Pantoktaator (EST), Pedigree (EST), Popidiot (EST), Robots in Disguise (UK), Static-X (USA), Velikije Luki (EST), Viikate (FIN), The Wildhearts (UK), Zetod (EST).
2008, 13–14 June
Black Lips (USA), Compromise Blue (EST), Danko Jones (CAN), Electric Eel Shock (JAP), The Fall (UK), Fujiya & Miyagi (UK), Helloween (GER), HU? (EST), Kotiteollisuus (FIN), Los Bastardos Finlandeses (FIN), Metsatöll (EST), Pitchshifter (UK), Propeller (EST), Psychoterror (EST), Silvi Vrait & Ultima Thule (EST), Sparks (USA), Truckfighters (SWE), Vaiko Eplik & Eliit (EST).
2007, 15–16 June
Agent M (EST), Apoptygma Berzerk (NOR), Clawfinger (SWE), Dagö (EST), The Datsuns (NZL), Electric Six (USA), Kosmikud (EST), Laibach (SLO), Metsatöll (EST), Nick Oliveri And The Mondo Generator (USA), Mr. Lawrence (EST), Pain (SWE), Pedigree (EST), Peer Günt (FIN), Poets of the Fall (FIN), Shelton San (EST), Tanel Padar & The Sun (EST), Tharaphita (EST).
2006, 9–10 June
Brides in Bloom (EST), Cleaning Women (FIN), The Cooper Temple Clause (UK), Hardcore Superstar (SWE), J.M.K.E. (EST), Korpiklaani (FIN), Kreator (GER), Metsatöll (EST), The Misfits (USA), Negative (FIN), No-Big-Silence (EST), Onu Bella Band (EST), Oomph! (GER), Rosta Aknad (EST), The Skreppers (FIN), Slide-Fifty (EST), Suburban Tribe (FIN), Ultima Thule (EST).
2005, 10–11 June
22-Pistepirkko (FIN), The 69 Eyes (FIN), Boomhauer (FIN), East Trading Wang (EST), Eläkeläiset (FIN), The Exploited (UK), Extra Virgin (FIN), Kometa (FIN), Led R (EST), Melody Club (SWE), Mesh (UK), Metsatöll (EST), Röövel Ööbik (EST), Singer Vinger (EST), SuperHuman (LAT), Tanel Padar & The Sun (EST), Therapy? (UK), Tõnis Mägi & Muusik Seif (EST)

References

External links

Official website

Heavy metal festivals in Estonia
Rock festivals in Estonia
Music festivals established in 2005
2005 establishments in Estonia
Rapla County
Defunct music festivals